The Apostolic Nunciature to Guyana is an ecclesiastical office of the Catholic Church in Guyana. It is a diplomatic post of the Holy See, whose representative is called the Apostolic Nuncio with the rank of an ambassador. The nuncio resides in Port of Spain, Trinidad.

List of papal representatives to Guyana
Apostolic Nuncios 
Eugenio Sbarbaro (26 August 1997 – 26 April 2000)
Emil Paul Tscherrig (8 July 2000 – 22 May 2004)
Thomas Edward Gullickson (15 December 2004 – 21 May 2011)
Nicola Girasoli (29 October 2011 – 16 June 2017)
Fortunatus Nwachukwu (4 November 2017 – 17 December 2021)
Santiago de Wit Guzmán (30 July 2022    – present)

See also
Apostolic Delegation to the Antilles

References

Guyana
 
Guyana–Holy See relations